Route 303 was a proposed state highway in the northeastern portion of New Jersey. The route originally was defined to go from an intersection with current-day Route 4 in Teaneck, then progressing northward through several local communities before connecting to the New York state line at Northvale. At the state line, Route 303 was to intertwine and become the current-day New York State Route 303 (NY 303). The alignment runs along the current alignment of County Route 505, which becomes NY 303 at the state line.

It was first planned in 1938 as Route S4D (a spur of Route 4), and once the 1953 renumbering of highways occurred, the S-4-D designation was replaced by Route 303. However, the highway was never assigned and remains unused to this day.

Proposed route 

The proposed alignment of Route 303 was to begin at an intersection with Route 4, a major highway in northern New Jersey, north of the community of Fort Lee. The route was to head northward along an alignment through the community of Teaneck, passing along an alignment similar to current-day County Route 505. The route was to eventually pass the New Jersey State Armory at an intersection with the proposed Liberty Road and continue northward to the New York state line at Northvale, where the 303 designation would continue northward as New York State Route 303.

History 

Route 303 originated as a proposed alignment of State Highway Route S-4-D, a spur of State Highway Route 4, a cross-state highway from Cape May to Paterson. The route was assigned in 1938, proposed to follow a highway known as the Liberty Road through the community of Teaneck. In 1941, the New Jersey State Legislature amended the proposal to include a highway known as the Liberty Road from Route 4 to New York State Route 303 (designated in 1930) at Northvale. The proposal sat around for twelve years, until January 1, 1953, when the New Jersey State Highway Department renumbered the state highways around New Jersey. As part of the renumbering, Route S-4-D was re-designated Route 303 to match up with NY 303. The route, as of 2007, has never been constructed, but the general alignment remains as County Route 505.

Proposed major intersections

See also

New Jersey Route 11
New Jersey Route 14

References

External links

303
Transportation in Bergen County, New Jersey